Rose is Miliyah Kato's First studio album, peaking at #2, It was released on October 26, 2005

Track listing

Charts

Notes and references 

2005 debut albums
Miliyah Kato albums